Friedrich William Adalbert von Bredow (24 May 1814 – 3 March 1890) was a German cavalry officer.

Military career 
By 1859, he had been given command of the 4th Dragoon Regiment. As a colonel, Bredow led the 2nd Cavalry Brigade in the Austro-Prussian War of 1866, and was promoted to major general.

He is best known as a hero of the Franco-Prussian War after the Battle of Mars-la-Tour on 16 August 1870. During this battle he commanded the Prussian 12th Cavalry Brigade on one of the last successful massed cavalry charges in warfare. Before his assault Bredow stated of that "it will cost what it will". "Von Bredow's Death Ride" resulted in massive casualties on the Prussian forces but he managed to defeat a French force that outnumbered them four to one. The event was used in the following decades by military tacticians to argue that cavalry charges could still win battles. Bredow was promoted to lieutenant general and given command of the 18th Infantry Division.

Bredow was awarded the Order of the Red Eagle on 2 December 1873.

References

Literature 

 Michael Howard: The Franco-Prussian War. The German Invasion of France, 1870–1871. London 2001.

1814 births
1890 deaths
Lieutenant generals of Prussia
Members of the Prussian House of Lords
People from the Province of Brandenburg
German untitled nobility
German military personnel of the Franco-Prussian War
Military personnel from Brandenburg